Parapaar  is a 2014 film   directed by Sanjoy Nag is based on the Moti Nandy novel. A convict, Rudra (Ahmed Rubel), who returns home to his wife (Rituparna Sengupta) and two kids after serving a 14-year jail term. He comes back to find his home-maker wife transformed into a woman who had grown stronger over the years while fending for herself and her kids. The film also stars Paoli Dam and Bratya Basu.
A 'tribute promo' was launched on 31 August 2014 to commemorate the birth anniversary of Rituparno Ghosh.

Cast
Ahmed Rubel as Rudra
Dr. Ejajul Islam
Rituparna Sengupta as Damini
Paoli Dam  as Urmila
Bratya Basu as Gopal

Crew
Cinematography - Indranil Mukherjee
Editor - Sanjib Datta
Sound Recordist - Gautam Nag
Sound Re-recordist - Anirban Sengupta  Dipankar Jojo Chaki 
Production Designer - Sushanta Paul
Assistant Directors - Subroto Ghosh, Mrityunjay Pramanik, Monalisa Giri, Debanjana Roy

Music
Composers - Sourendra and Soumyojit
Lyricist - Srijato 
Singers - Asha Bhonsle ,  Papon Subhomita Kaushiki Chakrabarty Ashtam Mandal

References

External links

2014 films
Bengali-language Indian films
2010s Bengali-language films